The 1945 Argentine Primera División was the 54th season of top-flight football in Argentina. The season began on April 22 and ended on December 2.

Gimnasia y Esgrima (LP) returned to Primera but the squad would be relegated again at the end of the season, after finishing last. River Plate won its 8th title.

League standings

References

Argentine Primera División seasons
Argentine Primera Division
Primera Division